is the news program made by Tokyo Broadcasting System, Inc.
It has been broadcast from March 28, 2005 to March 27, 2009.

Newscasters
Head newscaster

Commentator

Newscasters
 〔A maternity leave from February 4, 2008〕

 〔Successor newscaster until Hiroko Ogura returning〕
weathercasters

Rival programs
NHK News7 (NHK General Television)
News Every (Nippon Television)
Super News (Fuji Television)
Super J Channel (TV Asahi)

External links
"Evening 5" official website 

TBS Television (Japan) original programming
Japanese television news shows
2005 Japanese television series debuts
2009 Japanese television series endings